The 1935 Daily Mail Gold Cup was a professional billiards tournament sponsored by the Daily Mail. Tom Newman won the Gold Cup, winning all his four matches, ahead of Willie Smith who had three wins. It was the first Daily Mail Gold Cup tournament, an event which ran from 1935 to 1940.

Format
The event was a round-robin tournament played from 7 January to 16 March 1935 at Thurston's Hall in London, England. There were 5 competitors and a total of 10 matches. Each match lasted six days (Monday to Saturday) and consisted of two sessions of two hours each day. The 5 competitors were Joe Davis, Tom Newman, Willie Smith, Melbourne Inman and Tom Reece. The event was a sealed handicap in which the handicap was determined before the event started but was not disclosed to the players until after the tournament finished.

Results

Table

References

1935
Daily Mail Gold Cup
Daily Mail Gold Cup
Daily Mail Gold Cup